Valentín Enrique Pimentel Armuelles (born 30 May 1991) is a Panamanian footballer that plays for Deportivo Lara and the Panama national football team.

Club career
Born in Santa Ana, Pimentel played for the Chepo youth team and for second division teams Vista Alegre and SUNTRACS before joining Plaza Amador.

International career
He made his debut for Panama in a June 2015 friendly match against Ecuador  and he was called up to the Panama team for the 2015 CONCACAF Gold Cup; he played in Panama's opening game.

In May 2018 he was named in Panama's preliminary 35 man squad for the 2018 FIFA World Cup in Russia.

Career statistics

International

International goals
Scores and results list Panama's goal tally first.

Personal life
Pimentel studies at Panama University to earn a degree in shipping company management. He has a son with his wife Maria Fernanda Carrillo.

References

External links

1991 births
Living people
People from Panamá District
Association football midfielders
Panamanian footballers
Panama international footballers
La Equidad footballers
C.D. Plaza Amador players
Costa del Este F.C. players
Asociación Civil Deportivo Lara players
2015 CONCACAF Gold Cup players
Copa América Centenario players
2017 CONCACAF Gold Cup players
2018 FIFA World Cup players
Liga Panameña de Fútbol players
Categoría Primera A players
Venezuelan Primera División players
Panamanian expatriate footballers
Expatriate footballers in Colombia
Expatriate footballers in Venezuela
Panamanian expatriate sportspeople in Colombia
Panamanian expatriate sportspeople in Venezuela
2019 CONCACAF Gold Cup players
Veraguas Club Deportivo players